Carl Jason Austin-Behan  is a British former politician and community activist who currently serves as LGBT adviser to the Mayor of Greater Manchester. He served as Lord Mayor of Manchester from May 2016 to May 2017, being its first openly gay Lord Mayor. He was Labour councillor for Burnage from 2011 to 2018.

He served in the Royal Air Force from April 1991 until October 1997 and in 2001, aged 29, he won Mr Gay UK.

Early life and education
Austin-Behan was born in north Manchester and grew up in Crumpsall.

Career
Austin-Behan was discharged from the Royal Air Force in 1997 for being gay at a time when it was illegal to be openly gay in the RAF.

Austin-Behan was elected to Manchester City Council as Labour Member for Burnage ward in May 2011. In 2016 he was made Lord Mayor of Manchester, and his term ended in May 2017. He was Manchester's first openly gay Lord Mayor and one of its youngest at 44. In November 2017 Labour deselected him as the Labour candidate for the local elections in May 2018. He said that he was "hurt, upset and gutted" to have been deselected in favour of Momentum candidate Ben Clay.

In August 2018, he was appointed LGBT advisor to Greater Manchester mayor, Andy Burnham.

Awards and honours
RAF Safety Centre "Good Show" Award, Royal Air Force
Bronze Medal from the Royal Humane Society, for rescuing a pilot from a burning Hawk aircraft
1996: Mention in the Queen's Birthday Honours, with a Commander in Chief's Commendation
2001: Winner, Mr Gay UK
2019: Appointed a Deputy Lieutenant of the County of Greater Manchester. This gave him the Post Nominal Letters "DL" for Life.
2019: Appointed Officer of the Order of the British Empire (OBE) in the 2020 New Years Honours List for services to charity, LGBTQ+ equality and the community in Greater Manchester.

Personal life 
Austin-Behan married his partner of 12 years, Simon Behan in December 2015. In May 2016 the Metro reported that the couple were in the process of adopting a child.

See also
List of mayors of Manchester
List of the first LGBT holders of political offices in the United Kingdom
Timeline of LGBT history in the United Kingdom

References

External links

Living people
20th-century English LGBT people
20th-century Royal Air Force personnel
21st-century English LGBT people
Deputy Lieutenants of Greater Manchester
Gay politicians
LGBT mayors of places in the United Kingdom
English LGBT politicians
Labour Party (UK) councillors
Lord Mayors of Manchester
Officers of the Order of the British Empire
People from Crumpsall
Politicians from Manchester
Year of birth missing (living people)